François de Singly (1948) was born in Dreux, is a French sociologist and professor of sociology at Paris Descartes University.

He has worked a lot about family.

References

French sociologists
Living people
Year of birth missing (living people)
French male writers